Toireasa Gallagher née Ryan (born 24 June 1980)  is an Australian cyclist. She was born in the New South Wales city of Bathurst.  Before the 2004 Athens Paralympics, she piloted Lindy Hou in the tandem pursuit and road races; after the games, she was Hou's sole pilot. At the Athens Games, she won two silver medals in the Women's Road Race / Time Trial Tandem B1–3 and Women's Individual Pursuit Tandem B1–3 events. At the 2006 IPC World Cycling Championships, she won two gold medals. At the 2008 Beijing Games, she won a silver medal in the Women's Individual Pursuit B VI 1–3 event and a bronze medal in the Women's 1 km Time Trial B VI 1–3 event.

References

Australian female cyclists
Paralympic cyclists of Australia
Cyclists at the 2004 Summer Paralympics
Cyclists at the 2008 Summer Paralympics
Medalists at the 2004 Summer Paralympics
Medalists at the 2008 Summer Paralympics
Paralympic silver medalists for Australia
Paralympic bronze medalists for Australia
Paralympic sighted guides
Sportswomen from New South Wales
1980 births
Living people
Paralympic medalists in cycling